Edwin Mohamed (born 31 July 1937) is a Guyanese cricketer. He played in twelve first-class matches for British Guiana from 1957 to 1967.

See also
 List of Guyanese representative cricketers

References

External links
 

1937 births
Living people
Guyanese cricketers
Guyana cricketers